The 1991 Pacific typhoon season ran year-round in 1991, although most tropical cyclones tended to form in the northwestern Pacific Ocean between May and November, 1991. These dates conventionally delimit the period of each year when most tropical cyclones form in the northwestern Pacific Ocean.

The scope of this article is limited to the Pacific Ocean, north of the equator and west of the international date line. Storms that form east of the date line and north of the equator are called hurricanes; see 1991 Pacific hurricane season. Tropical Storms formed in the entire west pacific basin were assigned a name by the Joint Typhoon Warning Center. Tropical depressions in this basin have the "W" suffix added to their number. Tropical depressions that enter or form in the Philippine area of responsibility are assigned a name by the Philippine Atmospheric, Geophysical and Astronomical Services Administration or PAGASA. This can often result in the same storm having two names.

Season summary

Systems 
32 tropical cyclones formed this year in the Western Pacific, of which 30 became tropical storms. 17 storms reached typhoon intensity, of which 5 reached super typhoon strength.

Severe Tropical Storm Sharon (Auring) 

Sharon hit the Philippines.

Typhoon Tim 

On March 17, a cluster of thunderstorms grouped together which formed a low pressure area far east of the Mariana islands. The low pressure area rapidly intensified and became a tropical storm 4 days after formation. Favorable conditions allowed the system to continue to intensify into a Category 1 typhoon. High wind shear on March 25 caused the system to weakened, and it transitioned into an extratropical cyclone.

Tropical Storm Vanessa (Bebeng) 

Vanessa deepened over the South China Sea.

Typhoon Walt (Karing) 

On May 3 an area of disturbed area formed south east of the Mariana Islands. A day later the system strengthened into a tropical depression, and continued to intensify into typhoon status four days later. The system showed annular characteristics on May 11, showing an axisymmetric shape. Walt reached peak intensity on May 12, before showing a distinct eyewall replacement cycle lasting four hours from late May 13 to May 14. When the eyewall replacement cycle was over, a new, larger eye measuring 65 kilometers across formed. Walt soon turned north east, becoming extratropical on May 17, before merging with another extratropical cyclone north east of Japan.

Typhoon Yunya (Diding) 

After a month without any activity in the Western Pacific, a weak tropical depression (with winds of only 10 knots) developed just east of the Philippines and south of the Tropical Upper Tropospheric Trough on June 11. Located in an area of little wind shear, it headed southwestward, developing spiral-band outflow and becoming a tropical storm on the 12th. As a small central dense overcast (CDO) developed over Yunya, it rapidly developed, becoming a typhoon on the 13th as it paralleled the eastern Philippines. The mid-level ridge forced Yunya westward, where it briefly reached a peak intensity of  winds on the 14th. Subsequently, the eastward building of the subtropical ridge produced unfavorable vertical wind shear that weakened Yunya to a minimal typhoon before hitting Dingalan, Luzon early on the 15th. Yunya left Luzon as a minimal tropical storm at Lingayen Gulf. It turned northward due to a break in the ridge, and dissipated on the 17th near southern Taiwan due to the vertical shear.

Yunya would likely have been an uneventful cyclone had it not struck Luzon on the same day as the climactic eruption of Mount Pinatubo. The ash cloud that normally would have been dispersed across the oceans was redistributed over Luzon by the cyclonic winds of the typhoon, greatly exacerbating the damage caused by the eruption. The water-laden ash fell over the evacuated Clark Air Base, as well as the rest of Luzon, resulting in downed power lines and the collapse of flat-roofed buildings. In some areas it was practically raining mud.

Yunya exited Luzon through Lingayen Gulf as a weak tropical storm and then turned north toward a break in the subtropical ridge. The system continued to weaken due to the strong vertical wind shear. It then brushed the southern coast of Taiwan as a tropical depression and finally dissipated before it could complete full recurvature into the mid-latitude westerlies. Yunya directly caused one death from the flooding and heavy rainfall it left.

Typhoon Zeke (Etang) 

At least 23 people were killed by Zeke on Hainan Island.

Typhoon Amy (Gening) 

145 mph Typhoon Amy, having developed on July 12 over the open Western Pacific, brushed southern Taiwan on the 18th. Its outflow became restricted, and Amy hit southern China on the 19th as a 120 mph typhoon. It caused heavy flooding, resulting in 99 casualties, 5000 people injured, and 15,000 people homeless. In addition, Amy caused the sinking of the freighter in a river, resulting in an additional 31 deaths.

Severe Tropical Storm Brendan (Helming) 

Brendan was the third consecutive tropical cyclone to strike China during the month of July.

Typhoon Caitlin (Ising) 

Typhoon Caitlin developed from a disturbance in the eastern Caroline Islands. A tropical depression formed on July 23 as the system moved towards the northwest. Tropical Storm Caitlin was named the on the 24th and was upgraded to a typhoon the next day. Typhoon Caitlin though several hundred miles away increased the monsoonal flow over the Philippines. Heavy rains caused landslides in the Mt. Pinatubo region killing 16 people. As Caitlin turned to the north the storm passed  to the west of Kadena AB, Okinawa at peak intensity of 110 mph. The heavy rains from Caitlin helped to relieve the ongoing drought on the island, one death was reported. Typhoon Caitlin then began to accelerate northwards and passed through the Korea Strait before turning extratropical in the Sea of Japan. Heavy flooding in South Korea killed 2 people and caused $4 million in damage.

Tropical Depression Enrique 

Tropical Storm Enrique formed in the eastern Pacific basin, where it reached its peak intensity as a category 1 Hurricane, becoming Hurricane Enrique. Enrique lasted for several days drifting north of the Hawaiian Islands as a weak system. As Enrique approached the International Dateline, the system started to redevelop. Shortly after crossing the dateline, Enrique became a tropical storm again on August 1. It lasted for less than 24 hours before strong upper-level wind shear dissipated its convection, exposing the cyclone's circulation. No damages or casualties were caused by Enrique. It is one of only seven tropical cyclones to exist in all three tropical cyclone basins in the Pacific Ocean. The others are 1986's Georgette, 1994's Li and John, 1999's Dora, 2014's Genevieve and 2018's Hector.

Tropical Depression Doug 

Doug was a tropical storm according to the JTWC.

Typhoon Ellie (Mameng) 

Ellie was an unusually small typhoon which hit Taiwan as a tropical storm.

Typhoon Fred (Luding) 

Typhoon Fred organized from a monsoon trough situated to the east of the Central Philippines, a depression formed on August 11. The depression moved across northern Luzon Island, upon entering the South China Sea the depression was upgraded to Tropical Storm Fred. Fred reached typhoon intensity on August 14 as the storm moved south of Hong Kong. Fred reached peak intensity of  shortly before moving across Hainan Island. Fred then turned to the southwest across the Gulf of Tonkin and made a final landfall in northern Vietnam before dissipating. As Fred moved south of Hong Kong the oil rig support barge DB29 sank with 195 people on board; 22 people on board the ship were killed. On Hainan Island heavy flooding and landslides from Fred's rains killed 16 people.

Tropical Depression 13W 

13W lasted two days.

Severe Tropical Storm Gladys 

Minimal typhoon Gladys brushed by southern Japan on August 22. It moved to the northwest, and hit the Korean Peninsula on the 23rd. It caused more than 20 million yen of damage in Japan, more than 270 million won of damage in South Korea, and in South Korea, it left 103 dead or missing and more than 20,000 homeless.

Tropical Storm 15W 

15W was a long-lived depression that moved northwest.

Tropical Storm Harry 

Harry originally formed from a small cluster of thunderstorms in mid August.it moved over the Pacific Ocean and became better organized. On August 29, it was given the name “Harry”. It then moved north and made landfall on Japan a few days later. Harry then weakened because of the land and also because when it moved out to sea again, it moved over colder waters and dissipated on August 31.

Typhoon Ivy 

Typhoon Ivy formed from a broad monsoon trough situated near Kosrae in the eastern Caroline Islands. A tropical depression formed on September 2 as the system moved towards the northwest, the next day the depression strengthened into Tropical Storm Ivy. On Saipan one drowning death was reported, but only minor damage was reported in the Northern Marianas. Ivy paralleled the southeastern Japan coastline and turned extratropical  to the east of Tokyo. As Typhoon Ivy made its closest approach to Honshū, Tokyo and surrounding areas were buffeted by high winds and heavy rains. Over 200 landslides were reported and one person was killed with 4 others missing.

Tropical Storm Joel 

Joel hit southern China.

Typhoon Kinna (Neneng) 

Typhoon Kinna formed in a monsoon trough in the western Caroline Islands. A tropical depression began to organize on September 10 to the west of Guam, Tropical Storm Kinna was named later the same day. As Kinna moved towards the northwest the storm began to gather strength and reached typhoon intensity on September 12 just prior to turning north threatening Japan. Kinna maintained peak intensity after recurving to the north-northeast and making landfall on Kyūshū Island. Kinna continued moving across Japan and became extratropical near the northern coast of Honshū Island. Throughout Japan and Okinawa 9 deaths were attributable to Typhoon Kinna's passage.

Typhoon Mireille (Rosing)

Severe Tropical Storm Luke (Pepang) 

Tropical Storm Luke formed from a disturbance that moved through the Northern Marianas and became a tropical depression on September 14 just to the west of the islands. The depression began to slowly intensify as it moved towards the west-northwest and Tropical Storm Luke was named on September 15. Luke reached peak intensity of  prior to recurving to the northeast and weakening due to increased shear. Tropical Storm Luke then paralleled the southeastern Japan coastline, dropping heavy rains. The resulting flooding and landslides killed 8 people and left 10 others missing prior to Luke turning extratropical east of central Honshū Island.

Typhoon Nat (Oniang) 

Nat took an erratic track for over two weeks.

Typhoon Orchid (Sendang) 

Typhoon Orchid formed from a broad monsoon trough that moved through the Northern Marianas and became a tropical depression on October 4 to the west of the islands. The depression moved on a westerly path and strengthened into Tropical Storm Orchid later the same day. Typhoon Orchid paralleled the southeast coast of Shikoku and Honshū Islands. As Orchid brushed the islands 96 landslides and heavy flooding were reported in and around the Tokyo region, one person was reported killed due to flooding. Though a great distance away the waves from Orchid and Typhoon Pat combined to produce tremendous waves resulting in the deaths of 2 people on Guam.

Typhoon Pat 

Pat stayed at sea.

Typhoon Ruth (Trining) 

Super Typhoon Ruth formed from a tropical disturbance the originated between Chuuk and Pohnpei, as the disturbance moved on a westerly path, a tropical depression formed on October 20. Tropical Storm Ruth was named on the 21st as the storm moved to the southwest of Guam and began to steadily intensity. Ruth began to slowly decline in strength as it neared the northern Philippines. Ruth made landfall on October 27 on northern Luzon Island with winds of  before weakening to a tropical storm. Heavy flooding and numerous landslides were reported on Luzon Island as a result 12 people were killed. After departing Luzon Island Ruth recurved south of Taiwan and dissipated. Heavy seas caused the freighter Tung Lung to sink west of Taiwan, all 18 aboard were killed.

Typhoon Seth (Warling) 

A Category 4 Super Typhoon that affected the northern part of the Philippines. During most of Seth's early life, Seth remained a Tropical Storm, until it encountered warmer waters, where it began to reach its peak intensity on November 5. Seth peaked as a strong category 4 storm, but considerably weakened under typhoon strength when it made landfall in the Philippines as a Tropical Storm. After crossing through the Philippines near the end of its life, Seth stalled and dissipated about halfway between the Philippines and mainland Asia. Seth did feature a well defined eye, and struck the same area of the Philippines right after Super Typhoon Ruth did.

Tropical Storm Thelma (Uring) 

 Tropical Storm Thelma hit the central Philippines on November 4. It slowly tracked across the Archipelago, bringing heavy flooding across the islands. Vertical shear weakened it as it continued westward, and it dissipated on November 8 just after hitting southern Vietnam. Thelma, though a weak storm, caused dam failures, landslides, and flash flooding, resulting in a horrendous death toll of 6,000 people. Due to the massive casualties, the name Thelma was retired and replaced with Teresa.

Severe Tropical Storm Verne 

Verne curved away from land.

Tropical Storm Wilda (Yayang) 

Wilda hit the Philippines.

Typhoon Yuri 

Super Typhoon Yuri was the most powerful storm during the season, with winds reaching up to 120 knots (220 km/h), and a minimum recorded pressure of 895 mbar. This made Yuri the third most intense tropical cyclone on record at the end of 1991. Yuri caused $3 million (1991 USD) in damage to Pohnpei, including the loss of a radio tower. In Guam, the storm caused extensive beach erosion and destroyed between 60 and 350 buildings. There, damage totaled to $33 million (1991 USD). It is one of the most closely observed storms ever. Its eye was studied for research.

Severe Tropical Storm Zelda 

Tropical Storm Zelda was the last storm of the 1991 Pacific typhoon season.

Storm names 

During the season 29 named tropical cyclones developed in the Western Pacific and were named by the Joint Typhoon Warning Center, when it was determined that they had become tropical storms. These names were contributed to a revised list from mid-1989.

Philippines 

The Philippine Atmospheric, Geophysical and Astronomical Services Administration uses its own naming scheme for tropical cyclones in their area of responsibility. PAGASA assigns names to tropical depressions that form within their area of responsibility and any tropical cyclone that might move into their area of responsibility. Should the list of names for a given year prove to be insufficient, names are taken from an auxiliary list, the first 10 of which are published each year before the season starts. Names not retired from this list will be used again in the 1995 season. This is the same list used for the 1987 season. PAGASA uses its own naming scheme that starts in the Filipino alphabet, with names of Filipino female names ending with "ng" (A, B, K, D, etc.).

Retirement 
Due to extensive damage and a high death toll, the JTWC retired the names Mireille and Thelma, which were replaced by Melissa and Teresa. Both names were first used in the 1994 season. PAGASA also retired the name Uring with similar reasons and was replaced by Ulding for the 1995 season.

Season effects 
This table summarizes all the systems that developed within or moved into the North Pacific Ocean, to the west of the International Date Line during 1991. The tables also provide an overview of a systems intensity, duration, land areas affected and any deaths or damages associated with the system.

|-
| Sharon (Auring) ||  || bgcolor=#| || bgcolor=#| || bgcolor=#| || Caroline Islands, Philippines || None || None ||
|-
| Tim ||  || bgcolor=#| || bgcolor=#| || bgcolor=#| || Philippines, Japan || None || None ||
|-
| Vanessa (Bebeng) ||  || bgcolor=#| || bgcolor=#| || bgcolor=#| || Philippines, Vietnam, China ||  None || None ||
|-
| Walt (Karing) ||  || bgcolor=#| || bgcolor=#| || bgcolor=#| || Caroline Islands, Mariana Islands, Philippines, Ryukyu Islands || None || None ||
|-
| TD ||  || bgcolor=#| || bgcolor=#| || bgcolor=#| || None || None || None ||
|-
| Yunya (Diding) ||  || bgcolor=#| || bgcolor=#| || bgcolor=#| || Philippines || None ||  ||
|-
| TD ||  || bgcolor=#| || bgcolor=#| || bgcolor=#| || Caroline Islands || None || None ||
|-
| TD ||  || bgcolor=#| || bgcolor=#| || bgcolor=#| || Mariana Islands || None || None ||
|-
| Zeke (Etang) ||  || bgcolor=#| || bgcolor=#| || bgcolor=#| || Philippines, South China || None ||  ||
|-
| Amy (Gening) ||  || bgcolor=#| || bgcolor=#| || bgcolor=#| || Philippines, Taiwan, China || Unknown ||  ||
|-
| TD ||  || bgcolor=#| || bgcolor=#| || bgcolor=#| || Philippines || None || None ||
|-
| Brendan (Helming) ||  || bgcolor=#| || bgcolor=#| || bgcolor=#| || Philippines, Taiwan, South China || None || None ||
|-
| Caitlin (Ising) ||  || bgcolor=#| || bgcolor=#| || bgcolor=#| || Philippines, Taiwan, Japan, South Korea ||  ||  ||
|-
| Enrique ||  || bgcolor=#| || bgcolor=#| || bgcolor=#| || None || None || None ||
|-
| TD ||  || bgcolor=#| || bgcolor=#| || bgcolor=#| || None || None || None ||
|-
| Doug ||  || bgcolor=#| || bgcolor=#| || bgcolor=#| || None ||  None || None ||
|-
| Ellie (Mameng) ||  || bgcolor=#| || bgcolor=#| || bgcolor=#| || Ryukyu Islands, Taiwan, East China || None || None ||
|-
| Fred (Luding) ||  || bgcolor=#| || bgcolor=#| || bgcolor=#| || Philippines, South China, Vietnam, Laos, Thailand || Unknown ||  ||
|-
| 13W ||  || bgcolor=#| || bgcolor=#| || bgcolor=#| || None ||  None || None ||
|-
| Gladys ||  || bgcolor=#| || bgcolor=#| || bgcolor=#| || Japan, Korean Peninsula, Northeast China ||  ||  ||
|-
| TD ||  || bgcolor=#| || bgcolor=#| || bgcolor=#| || None || None || None ||
|-
| 15W ||  || bgcolor=#| || bgcolor=#| || bgcolor=#| || Japan, South Korea ||  None || None ||
|-
| Harry ||  || bgcolor=#| || bgcolor=#| || bgcolor=#| || Japan, South Korea ||  None || None ||
|-
| Ivy ||  || bgcolor=#| || bgcolor=#| || bgcolor=#| || Caroline Islands, Mariana Islands, Japan || Unknown ||  ||
|-
| Joel ||  || bgcolor=#| || bgcolor=#| || bgcolor=#| || Philippines, China, Taiwan ||  None || None ||
|-
| Kinna (Neneng) ||  || bgcolor=#| || bgcolor=#| || bgcolor=#| || Japan, Korean Peninsula || Unknown ||  ||
|-
| Mireille (Rosing) ||  || bgcolor=#| || bgcolor=#| || bgcolor=#| || Marshall Islands, Mariana Islands, Japan, Korean Peninsula, Russia Far East ||  ||  ||
|-
| Luke (Pepang) ||  || bgcolor=#| || bgcolor=#| || bgcolor=#| || Mariana Islands, Japan || None ||  ||
|-
| Nat (Oniang) ||  || bgcolor=#| || bgcolor=#| || bgcolor=#| || Philippines, Taiwan, China || Unknown || None ||
|-
| Orchid (Sendang) ||  || bgcolor=#| || bgcolor=#| || bgcolor=#| || Guam, Japan || None || None ||
|-
| Pat ||  || bgcolor=#| || bgcolor=#| || bgcolor=#| || Mariana Islands || None || None ||
|-
| Ruth (Trining) ||  || bgcolor=#| || bgcolor=#| || bgcolor=#| || Caroline Islands, Mariana Islands, Philippines || Unknown ||  ||
|-
| Seth (Warling) ||  || bgcolor=#| || bgcolor=#| || bgcolor=#| || Marshall Islands, Caroline Islands, Mariana Islands, Philippines || Unknown || None ||
|-
| Thelma (Uring) ||  || bgcolor=#| || bgcolor=#| || bgcolor=#| || Philippines, Vietnam ||  ||  ||
|-
| Verne ||  || bgcolor=#| || bgcolor=#| || bgcolor=#| || Marshall Islands, Caroline Islands, Mariana Islands || None || None ||
|-
| Wilda (Yayang) ||  || bgcolor=#| || bgcolor=#| || bgcolor=#| || Philippines ||  None || None ||
|-
| Yuri ||  || bgcolor=#| || bgcolor=#| || bgcolor=#| || Marshall Islands, Caroline Islands, Mariana Islands ||  || None ||
|-
| Zelda ||  || bgcolor=#| || bgcolor=#| || bgcolor=#| || Marshall Islands || None || None ||
|-

See also 

 Tropical cyclones in 1991
 1991 Atlantic hurricane season
 1991 Pacific hurricane season
 1991 North Indian Ocean cyclone season
 South-West Indian Ocean cyclone season: 1990–91, 1991–92
 Australian region cyclone season: 1990–91, 1991–92
 South Pacific cyclone season: 1990–91, 1991–92

References

External links 
 Japan Meteorological Agency
 Joint Typhoon Warning Center .
 China Meteorological Agency
 National Weather Service Guam
 Hong Kong Observatory
 Macau Meteorological Geophysical Services
 Korea Meteorological Agency
 Philippine Atmospheric, Geophysical and Astronomical Services Administration
 Taiwan Central Weather Bureau
 Satellite movie of 1991 Pacific typhoon season